Manas Das is an Indian footballer who is currently playing for Southern Samity in the I-League 2nd Division as a defender.

Career

Southern Samity
After spending two years at Chirag United S.C. as a youth Das signed a senior contract with I-League 2nd Division club Southern Samity.

References

External links
 goal.com
 

Indian footballers
1990 births
Living people
Footballers from Kolkata
Association football defenders
United SC players